Deh Sorkheh may refer to:
Deh Sorkheh, Hamadan
Deh Sorkheh, Borujerd, Lorestan Province
Deh Sorkheh, Selseleh, Lorestan Province

See also
Deh Sorkh (disambiguation)
Sorkheh Deh (disambiguation)